Sir Claude Coventry Mallet, CMG (20 April 1860 – 25 April 1941) was a British diplomat. He was British Minister to Panama, Costa Rica, and Uruguay.

References 

1860 births
1941 deaths
Companions of the Order of St Michael and St George
Ambassadors of the United Kingdom to Costa Rica
Ambassadors of the United Kingdom to Panama
Ambassadors of the United Kingdom to Uruguay
Knights Bachelor